N